Don McFarlane is the name of

 Don McFarlane (athlete, born 1926), Canadian sprinter (University of Western Ontario)
 Don McFarlane (athlete, born 1931), Canadian sprinter (McMaster University)